William Francis Dupree (June 7, 1909 – February 25, 1955), from Saranac Lake, New York, was an American bobsledder who competed from the late 1930s to the late 1940s. He won a bronze medal in the four-man event at the 1948 Winter Olympics in St. Moritz.

Dupree also won a bronze medal in the four-man event at the 1937 FIBT World Championships in St. Moritz.

References
Bobsleigh four-man Olympic medalists for 1924, 1932-56, and since 1964
Bobsleigh four-man world championship medalists since 1930
DatabaseOlympics.com profile

American male bobsledders
Bobsledders at the 1948 Winter Olympics
Olympic bronze medalists for the United States in bobsleigh
Sportspeople from Saratoga Springs, New York
1909 births
1955 deaths
Medalists at the 1948 Winter Olympics
People from Saranac Lake, New York